Live by Yo Rep (B.O.N.E. Dis) is an EP by Three 6 Mafia, followed by their previous debut album Mystic Stylez. The title track is a diss song directed at Bone Thugs-n-Harmony propelled by the at-the-time beef between the two groups.

Track listing
"A New Nightmare" – 1:10
"Triple 6 Mafia" – 1:45
"Throw Yo Setts in da Air" – 5:22
"Slippin" (performed by Koopsta Knicca) – 1:58
"Be a Witness" (performed by Killa Klan Kaze)- 5:03
"Live by Yo Rep" [Radio Edit] – 4:19
"Live by Yo Rep" [Screwed] - 4:20
"Tear da Club Up" [Da Real] – 4:33

References

1995 debut EPs
1995 compilation albums
Three 6 Mafia compilation albums
Three 6 Mafia EPs
Horrorcore albums
Gangsta rap EPs
Diss tracks
Albums produced by DJ Paul
Albums produced by Juicy J